Lethola Mofokeng (born 20 October 1984) is a South African professional footballer who played as a midfielder.

Career
Mofokeng began his professional career in 2003 with Jomo Cosmos. He was released from his contract in January 2009, and signed with Black Leopards in February 2009.

References

1984 births
Living people
People from Bethlehem, Free State
South African soccer players
Jomo Cosmos F.C. players
Black Leopards F.C. players
Mpumalanga Black Aces F.C. players
Bloemfontein Celtic F.C. players
Association football midfielders
South African Premier Division players
National First Division players